The following is a list of the camps and bases of the Singapore Armed Forces.

Singapore Army bases

Republic of Singapore Navy bases

Republic of Singapore Air Force bases

References

External links
 MINDEF terminology

Camps and bases
Lists of military units and formations
Air forces-related lists